Nabard  Metro Station is a station of Tehran Metro Line 4. It is located in Piruzi street at Cocacolla crossroad next to Kasa Commercial Complex.

References 

Tehran Metro stations